Stenocephalemys is a genus of rodent in the family Muridae. The genus is endemic to Ethiopia.

Species 
Stenocephalemys contains six described species:
 Ethiopian white-footed mouse (Stenocephalemys albipes) 
 Ethiopian narrow-headed rat (Stenocephalemys albocaudata) 
 Gray-tailed narrow-headed rat (Stenocephalemys griseicauda) 
 Rupp's mouse (Stenocephalemys ruppi) 
Stenocephalemys sokolovi 
Stenocephalemys zimai

References

 
Rodent genera
Taxonomy articles created by Polbot